Laja is a town  west of La Paz, in the La Paz Department in Bolivia. It is the seat of the Laja Municipality, the second municipal section of the Los Andes Province.

References 

Populated places in La Paz Department (Bolivia)